Frank Gibb (18 January 1868 – 23 March 1957) was an English cricketer.  Gibb's batting style is unknown, although it is known he was a left-arm fast bowler.  He was born at Wadhurst, Sussex.

Gibb made his first-class debut for Sussex against the Marylebone Cricket Club in 1890 at Lord's.  He made nine further first-class appearances for Sussex in that season, the last of which came against Kent at the County Ground, Hove.  Gibb's main role was a bowler, in his ten first-class matches for Sussex, he took 9 wickets at an expensive average of 61.11, with best figures of 2/140.  With the bat, he scored 41 runs at a batting average of 3.41, with a high score of 8.

He died at Hawkenbury, Kent, on 23 March 1957.

References

External links
Frank Gibb at ESPNcricinfo
Frank Gibb at CricketArchive

1868 births
1957 deaths
People from Wadhurst
English cricketers
Sussex cricketers